Russell Cheung is a Hong Kong actor under the contract of TVB.

Filmography

Television series
Face to Face  (1999)
On the Track or Off (2001)
Love is Beautiful (2002)
Let's Face It (2002)
Burning Flame II (2002)
Survivor's Law (2003)
Perish in the Name of Love (2003)
Net Deception (2004)
Revolving Doors of Vengeance (2005)
Into Thin Air (2005)
Always Ready (2005)
Forensic Heroes (2006)
Placebo Cure (2006)
La Femme Desperado (2006)
Dicey Business (2006)
Men in Pain (2006)
Maiden's Vow (2006)
Ten Brothers (2007)
The Family Link (2007)
On the First Beat (2007)
War and Destiny (2007)
The Ultimate Crime Fighter(2007)
Word Twisters' Adventures (2007)
Survivor's Law II (2007-2008)
Wasabi Mon Amour (2008)
The Four (2008)
Forensic Heroes II (2008)
Off Pedder (2008–2010)
The Winter Melon Tale (2009)
A Chip Off the Old Block (2009)
A Watchdog's Tale (2009)
Suspects in Love (2010)
An Uninvited Date (2010)
When Lanes Merge (2010)
Beauty Knows No Pain (2010)
Curse of the Royal Harem (2011)
36 Hours on Call (2012)
Brother's Keeper (2013)
36 Hours on Call II (2013)
  I Bet Your Pardon (2019)

External links

1977 births
Living people
Hong Kong male television actors
TVB veteran actors
20th-century Hong Kong male actors
21st-century Hong Kong male actors